are types of quiver used in Japanese archery. The quiver is unusual in that in some cases, it may have open sides, while the arrows are held in the quiver by the tips which sit on a rest at the base of the ebira, and a rib that composes the upper part and keeps them in place.

There are many types of ebira, some more ornate, some ceremonial, some more plain. Other types of ebira are more substantial and more boxlike, much like quivers from other countries.  The ebira was used  traditionally by samurai in combat or hunting, and also is used for ceremonial archery in modern-day Japan, such as in yabusame. It could be quite decorative. It is completely different from the cylindrical yazutsu, which is used only for carrying Kyūdō arrows. Some ebira could hold up to three dozen arrows.

The ebira can be slung over the back, or kept on saddle by horse archers.

Gallery

See also 
 Yazutsu
 Ya (arrow)
 Yumi

References 

Archery equipment of Japan
Samurai weapons and equipment